Laffy is the surname of:

 Gerry Laffy (born 1960), English singer and guitarist
 Michael Laffy (born 1967), former Australian rules footballer and contestant on the Australian reality TV show The Mole
 Simon Laffy (born 1958), English bassist

See also
 Laffy Taffy, a brand of taffy manufactured by Nestlé
 "Laffie", an episode of the TV series It's Garry Shandling's Show
 Laffey, a surname
 , two US Navy destroyers